Heusden-Zolder is a municipality located in the Belgian province of Limburg near Hasselt. On 1 January 2006 Heusden-Zolder had a total population of 30,769. The total area is 53.23 km² which gives a population density of 578 inhabitants per km².

Heusden-Zolder was the result of the merger on 1 January 1977 of the two former municipalities of Heusden and Zolder, and currently consists of the former Heusden parishes of Heusden centre, Berkenbos and Eversel, and the former Zolder parishes of Zolder centre, Boekt, Viversel, Bolderberg and Lindeman.

Heusden-Zolder is home to almost 2,000 immigrants from all over the world. This is due to the (now closed) coal mine of Zolder. During the 1960s Belgian coal mines faced an enormous shortage of employees. To address this problem, foreigner labourers were encouraged to immigrate and work near the mines. After their closure (the mine in Zolder was the last one in Belgium, the Netherlands and Luxemburg to close in 1992) most of the immigrants chose to stay, which makes Heusden-Zolder a relatively multicultural place.

Local infrastructure

The town hall, a large glass construction, is located in Zolder centre since the merger. As a compromise, the former town hall of Heusden is now used instead by the local social security department (OCMW).

Heusden-Zolder has one hospital, the Sint-Franciscusziekenhuis. Also, it has one secondary school, the Sint-Franciscuscollege, which is spread over two campusses: one in Heusden centre and one in Berkenbos. Heusden-Zolder also has a railway station, called "Zolder station". The town is easily accessible via the Albert Canal and the highway E314 and has therefore several industrial zones, such as 'Zolder-Lummen'.

Places of interest
 The Circuit Terlaemen, former home to the Formula One Belgian Grand Prix and host of the 2007 Belgian Champ Car Grand Prix. Also the 1969 and 2002 UCI Road World Championships, the 2002 and 2016 UCI Cyclo-cross World Championships and the 2003 Motocross des Nations were held at this same location.
 Meylandt Castle, a castle donated to Heusden-Zolder by the De Theux de Meylandt family. It is currently used as an art school.
 De Veen, an athletics stadium that yearly hosts the KBC Night of Athletics, the second most important athletics meeting in Belgium after the world famous Memorial Van Damme in Brussels.

Famous activities
 De Revue, comical theatre play in the Heusden dialect.
 The Grand Prix Erik De Vlaeminck Heusden-Zolder is a UCI Cyclo-cross World Cup competition traditionally held on Boxing Day.

Climate
Heusden-Zolder has an oceanic climate due to Gulf Stream influence, in spite of its inland position. The municipality is in the region with the warmest summers in the Benelux region with  July average highs.

Famous inhabitants
 Evil Superstars, indie rock band
 Regi Penxten, Milk Inc. and DJ
 Mario Borremans, mayor
 Luc Nilis, football player
 Dries Vanthoor, racing driver.

References

External links

 

 
Municipalities of Limburg (Belgium)